Coleophora namakella is a moth of the family Coleophoridae. It is found in Iran.

References

namakella
Moths described in 1977
Moths of the Middle East